William D. Spotnitz is a cardiothoracic surgeon and medical researcher who has made significant contributions to the development and testing of surgical techniques. He is a notable researcher in the United States in use of fibrin glue (a surgical adhesive used to create hemostasis). Spotnitz serves as a heart surgeon in the University of Virginia Health System. He also previously served as the director of the hospital's Tissue Adhesive Center, which promoted and advanced the use of adhesives in surgery. He currently serves as the director of the Surgical Therapeutic Advancement Center, a successor program conducting more generalized research in surgical procedures.

Spotnitz earned his bachelor's in chemistry from Harvard University and his medical degree from Columbia University College of Physicians and Surgeons. In 2007, he earned an MBA from the University of Florida. For his contributions in the “development of tissue adhesives for surgical use”, Spotnitz was inducted into the 2004 class of the College of Fellows of the American Institute for Medical and Biological Engineering.

Selected publications

References 

Living people
University of Virginia School of Medicine faculty
American surgeons
Harvard University alumni
University of Florida alumni
Columbia University Vagelos College of Physicians and Surgeons alumni
Year of birth missing (living people)